Kempas Highway or Jalan Kempas (Johor state route J3) is a major highway in Johor Bahru, Johor, Malaysia. It is the only state road in Malaysia constructed as a two-lane highway by an expressway concessionaire company, PLUS Expressway Berhad as a part of the North–South Expressway project. Kempas Highway was built to provide access to Johor Bahru from North–South Expressway Southern Route via Exit 255 Kempas Interchange.

Route background
The Kilometre Zero of Kempas Highway starts at Jalan Kempas Lama junctions.

At most sections, the Federal Route J3 was built under the JKR R5 road standard, allowing maximum speed limit of up to 90 km/h.

There are no alternate routes or sections with motorcycle lanes.

List of interchanges

Expressways and highways in Johor

References